Taylor Fritz was the defending champion and successfully defended his title after defeating Brayden Schnur 7–6(9–7), 6–4 in the final.

Seeds
All seeds receive a bye into the second round.

Draw

Finals

Top half

Section 1

Section 2

Bottom half

Section 3

Section 4

References
Main draw
Qualifying draw

2019 ATP Challenger Tour
2019 Men's Singles